San Pedro (Beni) is a small town in Bolivia.

References

Populated places in Beni Department